Shep Crawford (December 18, 1970) is a Grammy Award-winning American R&B and gospel musician, songwriter, and record producer best known for Whitney Houston's "Same Script, Different Cast", Deborah Cox's "Nobody's Supposed to Be Here", Tamia's "Stranger in My House", Sisqó's "Incomplete", and Kelly Price's "As We Lay". He is the founder and pastor of The Experience Christian Ministries in Los Angeles, California.

Early life and influences 
Crawford was born and raised in Los Angeles. He attended Carver Missionary Baptist Church with his family where he learned musicianship from Pastor Richard Stubbs. At the age of eight, Crawford began playing the piano and organ for the Carver Church each week. At the age of 19, he became a licensed pastor at Love and Unity Community Church by Pastor Carl A. McCorkle.

Career 
Crawford has written and produced multiple albums for chart-topping artists, including Whitney Houston, Luther Vandross, Tamia, Deborah Cox, Montell Jordan, and Kelly Price.

In 1995, Crawford co-produced the song "Daddy's Home" on Montell Jordan's debut album This Is How We Do It. Jordan brought Crawford on as his music director, after having known each other as musicians in church during their childhood, and Crawford began his professional career.

In 1998, he produced and co-wrote the platinum single Deborah Cox track "Nobody's Supposed to Be Here". The song was certified Platinum in the United States, spending a then-record fourteen weeks at number 1 on the Hot R&B/Hip-Hop Songs chart, and ranking at number 1 on the Billboard Dance Club Songs chart and number 2 on the Billboard Hot 100 Chart. In 2017, Billboard ranked the song at number 5 on its Greatest of All Time Hot R&B/Hip-Hop Songs chart.

It won the Soul Train Music Award for Best R&B/Soul Single (Female) and was nominated for the Billboard Music Award for Top R&B Song. He also wrote and produced the 1998 Deborah Cox track "We Can't Be Friends" which ranked at number 1 on the Billboard R&B/Hip-Hop Airplay chart for two weeks.

In 1999, Crawford produced and co-wrote the Sisqó song "Incomplete". The song was certified Platinum in the United States and ranked at number 1 on both the Billboard Hot 100 Chart and the Billboard Hot R&B/Hip-Hop Singles & Tracks chart.

In 2000, he produced the Whitney Houston and Deborah Cox duet "Same Script, Different Cast". It was nominated for the Soul Train Music Award for Best R&B/Soul Single (Group, Band or Duo). He also began working with Kelly Price and went on to produce multiple albums for her. That same year, Crawford was named as one of the top three producers and songwriters of the year by Billboard.

In 2001, Crawford won both the Grammy Award for Best Traditional R&B Performance for Glady Knight's album At Last and the Grammy Award for Best Contemporary Soul Gospel Album for Yolanda Adams' album The Experience. In 2003, Crawford won the Grammy Award for Song of the Year, the Grammy Award for Best Male R&B Vocal Performance, and the Grammy Award for Best R&B Album, and was nominated for the Grammy Award for Best R&B Song for Luther Vandross' album Dance With My Father. That same year, he wrote and produced the song "Stranger in My House" for Tamia. The song was ranked number 1 on the Billboard Dance Club Songs chart. He also founded 45 Live Records with former manager Erica Grayson and signed his first artist Onitsha, to produce her debut album Church Girl in collaboration with Still Waters, a division of Hidden Beach Recordings.

In 2012, he produced select songs on Tamia's album, Beautiful Surprise. The album and song of the same name were nominated for Best R&B Album and Best R&B Song at the 55th Annual Grammy Awards in 2013.

Discography

Vocals

Instruments and performance

Writing and arrangement

Production

Filmography

Film

Television

Awards and nominations 
In 2000, Crawford was named as one of the top three producers and songwriters of the year by Billboard.

Grammy Awards 

|-
| rowspan="2" |2001
| Glady Knight's At Last
| Grammy Award for Best Traditional R&B Performance
| 
|-
| Yolanda Adams' The Experience
| Grammy Award for Best Contemporary Soul Gospel Album
| 
|-
| rowspan="4" |2003
| rowspan="4" |Luther Vandross' Dance With My Father
| Grammy Award for Best R&B Song
| 
|-
| Grammy Award for Song of the Year
| 
|-
| Grammy Award for Best Male R&B Vocal Performance
| 
|-
| Grammy Award for Best R&B Album
| 
|-
| rowspan="2" |2013
| rowspan="2" |Tamia's Beautiful Surprise
| Grammy Award for Best R&B Album
| 
|-
| Grammy Award for Best R&B Song
| 
|-
|}

ASCAP Awards 

|-
| rowspan="2" |2000
| Deborah Cox's Nobody's Supposed to Be Here
| rowspan="3" |ASCAP Rhythm & Soul Music Award
| 
|-
| Deborah Cox's We Can't Be Friends
| 
|-
| 2002
| Tamia's Stranger in My House
| 
|-
|}

Billboard Music Awards 

|-
| 1998
| Deborah Cox's Nobody's Supposed to Be Here
| Billboard Music Award for Top R&B Song
| 
|-
|}

Soul Train Awards 

|-
| 1998
| rowspan="2" |Deborah Cox's Nobody's Supposed to Be Here
| Soul Train Music Award for Best R&B/Soul Single – Female
| 
|-
| 1999
| Soul Train Lady of Soul Award for Best R&B/Soul Song of the Year
| 
|-
|}

References

External links
 Shep Crawford on Experience Christian Ministries
 

American gospel musicians
Grammy Award winners
Songwriters from California
Record producers from California
21st-century American composers
People from Los Angeles
1970 births
Living people